Haywood County Schools may refer to:

 Haywood County Schools (North Carolina)
 Haywood County Schools (Tennessee)